A wadi (from Arabic: وادي wādī) is a dry river or its valley.

Wadi may also refer to:

 Waddy, a hardwood Aboriginal Australian club
 WADI, a radio station in Corinth, Mississippi, United States
 Wadi, a fictional race in the Star Trek universe, see "Move Along Home"
 Wadi, a minor character on The Secret Saturdays
 Wadi, Karnataka, a town in India
 Wadi, Maharashtra, a town in India
 Wadi of the Maldives, a 13th-century Sultan of the Maldives

See also
 Silicon Wadi, a region in Israel known for its high-tech industries
 Vadi (disambiguation)
 Waddy (disambiguation)